García Fernández Manrique y Toledo, 3rd Count of Osorno  (c. 1483–1546) was a Spanish nobleman.

He was the son of Don Pedro Fernández Manrique, 2nd Count de Osorno and of Teresa de Toledo, daughter of García Álvarez de Toledo, 1st Duke of Alba. He was president of the Council of the Indies, a position he held until his death in 1546.

Descendants
In 1503, the Count married Juana Enríquez, Lady of la Vega and Ruy Ponce, who died the same year. In 1504 he married for a second time with Juana de Cabrera y Bobadilla, daughter of Andrés de Cabrera, 1st Marquis of Moya, with whom he had three children. In 1506 he married for a third time with María de Luna y Bobadilla, daughter of Alvaro de Luna, 2nd Lord of Fuentidueña.

By Juana de Cabrera:
 Pedro Fernández Manrique, 4th Count de Osorno (1504–1569)
 Alonso Manrique de Lara
 Juan Manrique

By María de Luna:
 María Magdalena Manrique, married Andrés Hurtado de Mendoza, 3rd Marquis of Cañete
 Diego Hurtado de Mendoza, 4th Marquis of Cañete
 García Hurtado de Mendoza, 5th Marquis of Cañete
 Isabel de Luna

Ancestry

Additional information

Notes

Sources

1478 births
1546 deaths
Garcia 03
Knights of Santiago